Sea spinach is a common name for several plants and may refer to:

Beta vulgaris subsp. maritima, native to Europe and North Africa
Tetragonia decumbens, native to southern Africa
Tetragonia tetragonioides, native to New Zealand, Australia, Japan and southern South America